Kulma may refer to: 
 The Kulma Pass, a mountain pass across the Pamir Mountains on the border between the Gorno-Badakhshan Autonomous Region of Tajikistan and the Xinjiang Autonomous Region of China
 kulma, a curry from the Southern Philippines